The  Holden HT series is a range of automobiles which was produced by Holden in Australia between 1969 and 1970.

Introduction
Holden HT Belmont, Kingswood and Premier models were introduced in May 1969,
replacing their Holden HK series equivalents which had been in production since 1968. HT Brougham and Monaro models followed in June 1969. Noticeable changes from the HK series included new grilles, new taillights, flatter rear flanks and a wider back window. The Station Sedan name is no longer used on the wagons. Other changes included increased track width, revised suspension, a new instrument panel and synchromesh on all forward gears on manual gearbox models.

Model range 
The mainstream HT series was offered in four-door sedan and five-door station wagon body styles in three trim levels
 Belmont sedan
 Belmont wagon
 Kingswood sedan
 Kingswood wagon
 Premier sedan
 Premier wagon

The Brougham, which used a body with an extended boot, was available in one model only.
 Brougham sedan

The Monaro was offered in three two-door coupe models
 Monaro coupe
 Monaro GTS coupe
 Monaro GTS 350 coupe

Commercial vehicle derivatives were available in two-door coupe utility and two-door panel van body styles in two trim levels.
 Belmont utility
 Belmont panel van
 Kingswood utility

Engines and transmissions
The 161-cubic-inch (2.6-litre) and 186-cubic-inch (3.0-litre) six-cylinder engines were carried over from the HK range.  Australian manufactured 253-cubic-inch (4.2-litre) and 308-cubic-inch (5.0-litre) V8 engines were new, replacing the imported 307-cubic-inch (5.0-litre) V8s. Initially the 308 was fitted to only the Brougham, and existing stocks of the imported 307 were used in other models. Once these supplies were exhausted, the 308 V8 was made available as an option across the HT range. The 327-cubic-inch (5.3-litre) Chevrolet V8 that had powered the HK Monaro GTS 327 was replaced by a 350-cubic-inch (5.8-litre) Chevrolet V8 in the newly introduced HT Monaro GTS 350 model. Three-speed manual, four-speed manual and two-speed "Powerglide" automatic transmissions were offered.

A smaller,  version of Holden's inline-six Red motor ("130 HC") was available for export markets. It produced  at 4400 rpm and was meant for higher octane fuel.

Production
The HT range was replaced by the Holden HG series in July 1970, production having totaled 183,402 units.

Chevrolet El Camino (South Africa) 

The HT utility was assembled in South Africa as the Chevrolet El Camino. The interior, front fascia, and badging were unique to South Africa and it received either a Chevrolet  six-cylinder engine or the V8. Less than 500 Holdens were exported in this way.

References 

Cars of Australia
HT
Cars introduced in 1969
1970s cars